Riccardo Zoidl (born 8 April 1988) is an Austrian cyclist, who rides for UCI Continental team .

Career
In 2012 he won the Austrian National Time Trial Championships and in 2013 and 2014 he won the Austrian National Road Race Championships. His biggest victory to date has been the 2013 Tour of Austria.

Zoidl left  at the end of the 2013 season, and joined  for the 2014 season. He was named in the start list for the 2015 Vuelta a España.

In December 2018 the  announced that they had recruited Zoidl for 2019 as a replacement for fellow Austrian Stefan Denifl, after the team and Denifl had agreed to cancel the latter's contract due to personal reasons. He left the team following the 2019 season, rejoining  for 2020 – his third spell with the team. He joined  for the 2022 season, but signed a contract to rejoin  for a fourth time, for the 2023 season.

Major results
Source: 

2010
 9th Overall Thüringen Rundfahrt der U23
 9th Overall Tour de Berlin
2011
 1st Tobago Cycling Classic
 Sibiu Cycling Tour
1st Stages 1 & 5
 2nd Road race, National Road Championships
 5th Overall Oberösterreich Rundfahrt
2012
 1st  Time trial, National Road Championships
 3rd Overall Oberösterreich Rundfahrt
1st Points classification
1st Stage 3
 3rd Belgrade–Banja Luka II
 5th Trofeo Zsšdi
 6th Overall Okolo Slovenska
 6th Overall Tour of Szeklerland
1st Stage 1 (TTT)
 9th Grand Prix Südkärnten
 10th Poreč Trophy
2013
 1st  Road race, National Road Championships
 1st Overall UCI Europe Tour
 1st  Overall Oberösterreich Rundfahrt
1st  Points classification
1st Stages 2 & 3
 1st  Overall Circuit des Ardennes
1st Stage 2
 1st  Overall Tour de Bretagne
1st Stage 2
 1st  Overall Tour of Austria
 1st Raiffeisen Grand Prix
 1st Croatia–Slovenia
 2nd Poreč Trophy
 4th Overall Giro della Regione Friuli Venezia Giulia
 4th Overall Okolo Jižních Čech
 5th Overall Settimana Internazionale di Coppi e Bartali
 8th Overall Istrian Spring Trophy
 8th Grand Prix Südkärnten
2014
 1st  Road race, National Road Championships
 3rd Overall Tour Méditerranéen
 5th Overall Tour of Austria
2015
 2nd Time trial, National Road Championships
 8th Overall Tour of California
2016
 3rd Time trial, National Road Championships
 10th Overall Tour of Croatia
1st  Mountains classification
1st Stage 4
2017
 2nd Overall Oberösterreich Rundfahrt
 2nd Overall Flèche du Sud
1st Stage 3
 National Road Championships
4th Road race
4th Time trial
 5th Overall Circuit des Ardennes
1st  Points classification
1st Stage 4
 5th Pro Ötztaler 5500
 9th Raiffeisen Grand Prix
2018
 1st  Overall Czech Cycling Tour
1st  Points classification
1st Stage 2
 1st  Overall Tour de Savoie Mont-Blanc
1st  Points classification
 2nd Overall Oberösterreich Rundfahrt
 2nd Raiffeisen Grand Prix
 4th Road race, National Road Championships
 5th Overall Tour of Austria
2019
 7th Overall Tour of Austria
2020
 Tour of Antalya
1st  Mountains classification
1st Stage 3
2021
 2nd Overall Oberösterreich Rundfahrt
 5th Overall Sibiu Cycling Tour
 5th Overall Czech Cycling Tour
 10th GP Czech Republic, Visegrad 4 Bicycle Race
2022
 5th Overall International Tour of Rhodes
 5th Overall Oberösterreich Rundfahrt
 8th Overall Czech Cycling Tour

Grand Tour general classification results timeline

References

External links

1988 births
Living people
Austrian male cyclists
Sportspeople from Linz